1,2-Difluoroethylene, also known as 1,2-difluoroethene, is an organofluoride with the molecular formula CHF.  It can exist as either of two geometric isomers, cis-1,2-difluoroethylene or trans-1,2-difluoroethylene.

It is regarded as a hazardous chemical for being toxic by inhalation, and a volatile chemical, and it causes irritation when it comes into contact with the skin and mucous membranes.

E-Z relative stability 
For most 1,2-disubstituted compounds that exhibit cis–trans isomerism, the trans (E) isomer is more stable than the cis (Z) isomer. However, 1,2-difluoroethylene has the opposite situation, with the cis more stable than the trans by 0.9 kcal/mol.

See also
1,1-Difluoroethylene
Perfluoroisobutene

References

Organofluorides
Haloalkenes